Anda is a village located in Durg Tehsil of Durg district in the Indian state of Chhattisgarh. The village population is estimated to be at 4,169.

As the constitution of India and Panchyati Raaj Act, Anda village is administrated by a Sarpanch (Head of Village) who is elected representative of the village.

Village Anda It is believed that the name of this village was not Anda since the time of Lord Krishna. This village is located in Durg district of Chhattisgarh state. This is the distance of the village, about 13 kms from Durg bus stand. It is a matter of Dwapar era, at that time the number of snake snakes was more.

Geography
Anda is located at 
15 km south of Durg (the district's headquarters) and 48 km from Raipur the state capital.

The postal head office has pincode 491221.

Kuthrel (3 km), Janjgiri (3 km), Otebandh (3 km), Danganiya (4 km), Risama (5 km) are the nearby Villages to Anda.

Anda is surrounded by Durg Tehsil towards north, Bhilai Tehsil towards north, Rajnandgaon Tehsil towards west, Pata Tehsil towards east. 
Bhilai , Durg-Bhilai Nagar , Rajnandgaon , Balod are the nearby cities to Anda.

Demographics
In Anda village, the population of children aged 0–6 is 474, which makes up 11.37% of Anda's total population. Average Sex Ratio of Anda village is 1,012 which is higher than Chhattisgarh state average of 991. Child Sex Ratio for Anda as per census is 904, which is lower than Chhattisgarh average of 969.

Literacy
Anda village has higher literacy rate, as compared to Chhattisgarh. In 2011, literacy rate of Anda village was 81.60% compared to 70.28% of Chhattisgarh. In Anda male literacy stands at 91.17%, while the female literacy rate was 72.28%.

Caste Factor
Schedule Caste (SC) constitutes 20.17% while Schedule Tribe (ST) were 2.76% of total population in Anda village.
 
Occupational Profile
In Anda village out of total population, 1,829 were employed or working for themselves. 66.76% of workers describe their work as "main work" (Employment or Earning more than 6 Months) while 33.24% were involved in "Marginal activity" providing livelihood for less than 6 months. Of 1,829 workers engaged in "main work", 261 were cultivators (owner or co-owner) while 222 were Agricultural laborers.

Places of interest

Sohadar devi temple 
In the village there is a temple named Sohadar Devi Temple. Every year in Chaitra Navratri an Akhand Jyot is established here.

Otebandh
Otebandh village is 3.8 km from Anda village. There is a famous Vishnu temple located in this village.

Balod
Balod is 45 km from anda village. Jhalmala Devi temple is very famous in Balod.

Education

Schools
 Government Higher Secondary School, And a.
 Government Primary School, Anda.
 Priyadarshini Public School, Anda.

Nearest colleges
 Shaildevi Mahavidyalay Anda.
 Rajiv Lochan Ayurved Medical College, Chandkhuri.
 Garv Institute Of Management & Technology (gimt), Durg.
 Bharti College Of Engineering And Technology (bcet), Durg.

Connectivity

Airports Near By Anda
Raipur Airport, 55 km from Anda.

Railway Stations Connecting Anda
Risama 5 km from Anda.
Gunderdehi 14 km from Anda.
Durg 16 km from Anda
Major Railway Station that connects to Maximum Number of Main stations in India.

Bhilai Nagar 14 km from Anda.

External links
Official Durg government site
Official Durg government site
Official Ministry of Panchayati raj  site

Villages in Durg district